Xu Jing (born September 6, 1990 in Shandong) is a Chinese archer. At the 2012 Summer Olympics she competed for her country in the Women's team event, winning a silver medal, and also in the individual event.  In 2014 became the world number one ranked archer.

See also 
 China at the 2012 Summer Olympics

References

External links
 
 
 

Chinese female archers
Living people
1990 births
Olympic archers of China
Archers at the 2012 Summer Olympics
Olympic silver medalists for China
Olympic medalists in archery
Sportspeople from Yantai
Medalists at the 2012 Summer Olympics
Asian Games medalists in archery
Archers at the 2014 Asian Games
World Archery Championships medalists
Asian Games silver medalists for China
Asian Games bronze medalists for China
Medalists at the 2014 Asian Games
21st-century Chinese women